Dacrydium spathoides is a species of conifer in the family Podocarpaceae. It is found only in a small area of the Central Highlands of Western New Guinea (Papua).

References

spathoides
Near threatened plants
Endemic flora of Western New Guinea
Taxonomy articles created by Polbot
Taxa named by David John de Laubenfels